Hvězda jede na jih is a 1958 Czechoslovak-Yugoslavian comedy film directed by Oldrich Lipský.

Cast
 Gordana Miletić - Sona Klánová - singer
 Rudolf Hrušínský - Conductor
 Joza Gregorin - Driver Dargo
 Barbara Połomska - Lída
 Ludmila Píchová - Camper Nademlejnská
 Rudolf Deyl - Alfréd Necásek
 Stella Zázvorková - Camper Petioká
 Miloš Kopecký - Soustek - tourist guide
 Eman Fiala - Camper Strouhal
 Jaroslav Stercl - Drummer Pistelák
 Rudolf Cortés - Rudy Bárta - singer
 Karel Effa - Egon Zejda - guitarist
 Vladimír Menšík - Clarinetist Vostrák
 Lubomír Lipský - Trombonist Holpuch
 Josef Hlinomaz - Trumpetist Bríza

External links
 

1958 comedy films
1958 films
1950s Czech-language films
Films directed by Oldřich Lipský
Serbo-Croatian-language films
Yugoslav comedy films
Czechoslovak multilingual films
1950s multilingual films
Yugoslav multilingual films
1950s Czech films